Ambassador Edward Boateng is a Ghanaian diplomat, business executive, politician, and member of the New Patriotic Party. As a diplomat, Edward has impacted government policies in Ghana and in recent times bilateral relations between Ghana and China.

He is currently the Director-General of Ghana's State Interests and Governance Authority (SIGA) succeeding Stephen Asamoah Boateng. SIGA is an institution established by an Act of Parliament, Act 990, to ensure efficiency and profitability in state-owned enterprises while promoting good corporate governance.

Education
Ambassador Boateng holds an MBA from Clark-Atlanta University (USA), a Post Graduate diploma from Yale University (USA), and a bachelor's degree in Economics and Law from the Kwame Nkrumah University of Science and Technology in Ghana.

Personal life
Ambassador Boateng is married with four children.

Ambassadorial Appointment
In June 2017, President Nana Akuffo-Addo named Edward Boateng as Ghana's ambassador to China. He was among twenty two other distinguished Ghanaians who were named to head various diplomatic Ghanaian mission in the world.

Career Life Before Ambassadorial Appointment
He worked at Turner Broadcasting on the strategic product development and international sales team. He facilitated the company's entry into Africa and went on to be a senior executive member of the company’s Europe, Middle East and Africa (EMEA) unit, in London and later South Africa.

Prior to his ambassadorial appointment, Ambassador Boateng was primarily recognized as a media mogul and the founder of Pan African media and entertainment conglomerate Global Media Alliance (GMA) which he set up in South Africa in the year 1998 and later moved to Ghana in 2001. The media company is one of Ghana’s most revered media, communication, and events management firms with diversified radio stations: Happy FM and YFM; a television station:eTV Ghana, a media education center: e-Academy, and multiple cinema houses under its wing.

References

Year of birth missing (living people)
Living people
Ambassadors of Ghana to China
New Patriotic Party politicians

Ghanaian diplomats
Ghanaian businesspeople